Sybil is a 1921 British silent drama film directed by Jack Denton and starring Evelyn Brent, Cowley Wright and Gordon Hopkirk. It is an adaptation of the 1845 novel Sybil by Benjamin Disraeli. It is considered to be a lost film.

Cast
 Evelyn Brent - Sybil Gerard 
 Cowley Wright - Honorable Charles Egremont 
 Gordon Hopkirk - Stephen Hatton 
 Harry Gilbey - James Hatton 
 Philip D. Williams - James Marney 
 William Burchill - Father

References

External links

1921 films
Films directed by Jack Denton
1921 drama films
British silent feature films
British drama films
British black-and-white films
Films set in England
Films based on British novels
Ideal Film Company films
Lost British films
1920s English-language films
1920s British films
Silent drama films